Sab Khelo Sab Jeeto is  an Indian television game show which aired on SAB TV from 12 October 2013 to 13 July 2014 hosted by Cyrus Sahukar.

References 

Sony SAB original programming
Indian game shows
2013 Indian television series debuts
2014 Indian television series endings